Benjamin S. Adamowski (November 20, 1906 – March 1, 1982) was a politician and lawyer.

Early life
His father, Max Adamowski, was an alderman in Chicago, as well as a real estate agent in Logan Square, and tavern owner. He graduated from DePaul University Law School in 1928.

Career
He served in the Illinois House of Representatives, representing the 25th District from 1931 through 1941. In the legislature, he distanced himself from the machine politics his father had been aligned with, and aligned himself with liberal reformist governor Henry Horner. In 1940, Adamowski unsuccessfully sought the Democratic nomination in the special U.S. Senate election.

In 1941, Adamowski left the legislature to serve as the Corporation Council of Chicago under Mayor Martin H. Kennelly, a role he held for three years.

He was a Democrat until 1955, when he was defeated by Richard J. Daley in the Democratic primary for mayor. In later campaigns for State's Attorney and a second bid for mayor against Daley in 1963 he ran as a Republican.

He served from 1957 to 1960 as State's Attorney of Cook County.

References

1906 births
1982 deaths
DePaul University College of Law alumni
Politicians from Chicago
Illinois Democrats
Illinois Republicans
Members of the Illinois House of Representatives
20th-century American politicians
District attorneys in Illinois